Bajou Baijnauth (14 May 1916 – 7 April 1985) was a Guyanese cricketer. He played in seven first-class matches for British Guiana from 1946 to 1960.

See also
 List of Guyanese representative cricketers

References

External links
 

1916 births
1985 deaths
Guyanese cricketers
Guyana cricketers